Footloose: Music from the Motion Picture, the original soundtrack for the 2011 remake of Footloose, was released by Atlantic Records and Warner Music Nashville on September 27, 2011. It includes eight new songs and four remakes of songs from the original film's soundtrack. "Footloose" by Kenny Loggins was covered by Blake Shelton in a country style for the remake. The film includes Loggins's original version of the song as well as "Bang Your Head (Metal Health)" by the heavy metal band Quiet Riot and "Let's Hear It for the Boy", which are not on the soundtrack album. A cover of "Almost Paradise", performed by Victoria Justice and Hunter Hayes, was released on September 22, 2011.

Track listing

Chart performance

Weekly charts

Year-end charts

References

2011 soundtrack albums
2010s film soundtrack albums
Pop rock soundtracks
Country music soundtracks
Atlantic Records soundtracks
Warner Music Group soundtracks